Birdland is an American medical drama series that aired on ABC from January 5 to April 21, 1994.

Premise
A psychiatrist with his own problems treats the patients at Roosevelt Hospital.

Cast
Brian Dennehy as Dr. Brian McKenzie
CCH Pounder as Nurse Lucy
Lindsay Frost as Dr. Jessie Lane
Julio Oscar Mechoso as Hector
John Rothman as Dr. Alan Bergman
David Packer as Dr. Zuchetti
Jeff Williams as Dr. Lewis Niles
Kevin J. O'Connor as Mr. Horner
Leslie Mann as Nurse Mary

Episodes

External links

1994 American television series debuts
1994 American television series endings
1990s American drama television series
American Broadcasting Company original programming
1990s American medical television series
English-language television shows
Television shows filmed in Vancouver
Television series by Sony Pictures Television
Television shows set in Oakland, California
Television series created by Scott Frank
Television series created by Walter F. Parkes